William Humphrey Page (1848 – 26 October 1925) was a British-born Indian Judge and Australian politician. 

Page was born in 1848. Following legal training in London, he served as a justice at the Bombay High Court. In 1897 he was elected to the Tasmanian House of Assembly, representing the seat of Hobart. He served until his defeat in 1900. 

He died in 1925 in Bruges, Belgium, having survived the occupation during World War One. His son was the noted legal writer and prison reformer Sir Leo Page.

References

1848 births
1925 deaths
Members of the Tasmanian House of Assembly

British India judges
Irish Australian